Ystumllyn is a Grade II* listed house in Criccieth, Wales. Founded in the late-16th-century, and significantly expanded in the early-18th-century, it is remarkable as an "important example" of the vernacular architecture of both periods.

History
The house was apparently built at the end of the 16th century by Ellis ap Cadwaladr (d. 1597), a member of the Welsh Ellis family, which claimed to trace its lineage back to Gollwyn ap Tangno, founder of one of the Fifteen Tribes of Wales. Ellis obtained the property from the Crown, and is the first member of the family to be described as "of Ystumllyn". When it was first built, the house was likely one of the earliest storied buildings in the region. Before 20th-century renovations, the house bore two dated inscriptions of 1720 and 1729 giving a likely date for the extensive 18th-century remodeling and extensions. The owner in this period was Rev. Humphrey Wynn (d. 1724), whose initials are featured on the earlier of these inscriptions. By 1725, it was in possession of Ellis Wynn (d. 1759) who held in until his death. In 1824, the estate passed to philologist Rowland Jones. The roof was raised and the fenestration was remodeled in the 19th century. In , J. Egbert Griffiths of Porthmadog carried out several minor alterations, adding some extra windows and rearranging the internal room structure. On 12 December 1994, the building was designated a Grade II* listed building, a listing reserved for "particularly important buildings of more surthan special interest".

The house was home to several local notables throughout its history. The Welsh poet Gruffydd Phylip (d. 1666) composed several poems addressed to the Ellis family, including a poem directly referencing the house, "" ("The Bard's Longing for Ystumllyn"). John Ystumllyn (d. 1786), who took his name from the household, was employed by the Wynn family at this estate as a gardener and survived as the first well-recorded black person of North Wales. He was of uncertain origins, and was possibly kidnapped from Africa by the Wynn family, but lived out a happy life in Ystumllyn, eventually running away with and marrying a local woman.

Architecture

Ystumllyn is a rubble-built house of two stories, composed of two blocks arranged into a T-shaped plan. The east-facing block is the earliest part of the building, dating to the late 16th century, while the north-facing block (which bisects the east block) was constructed in the early 18th century. The building has been described as historically remarkable in the British Listed Buildings rationale for registering it as a Grade II* listed building; its original component "incorporates an important example" of 16th-century architecture, while its 18th-century additions "represent high quality vernacular work of the period".

Gallery

References

Sources

External links
 Ystumllyn Site Details at Colfein

Criccieth
Grade II* listed buildings in Gwynedd
Houses in Gwynedd